Aegean civilization is a general term for the Bronze Age civilizations of Greece around the Aegean Sea. There are three distinct but communicating and interacting geographic regions covered by this term: Crete, the Cyclades and the Greek mainland. Crete is associated with the Minoan civilization from the Early Bronze Age. The Cycladic civilization converges with the mainland during the Early Helladic ("Minyan") period and with Crete in the Middle Minoan period. From c. 1450 BC (Late Helladic, Late Minoan), the Greek Mycenaean civilization spreads to Crete, probably by military conquest.

The earlier Aegean farming populations of Neolithic Greece brought agriculture to Western Europe already before 5,000 years BC.

Aegean Neolithic farmers 

A DNA study from 2019 indicates that agriculture was brought to Western Europe by the Aegean populations that are known as "Aegean Neolithic farmers". These Neolithic groups arrived to northern France and Germany already around 5000 BC. About 1000 years later, they arrived in Britain.

When they left the Aegean, these populations quickly split into two groups with somewhat different cultures. One group went north along the Danube, while the other took a southerly route along the Mediterranean and reached Iberia. This latter group then arrived in Britain.

Prior to that, these territories were populated by the hunter-gathererer cultures known as the 'western hunter-gatherers', similar to the Cheddar Man.

Most of the ancestry of the British population after 4000 BC (74% on average) is attributable to the Aegean Neolithic farmers. This indicates a substantial shift in ancestry with the transition to farming.

The Chalcolithic (Copper Age) started in Europe about 5500 BC. Numerous megalithic structures and monuments were also erected in this period.

Periodization

Mainland

 Early Helladic (EH): 3200/3100–2050/2001 BC
 Middle Helladic (MH): 2000/1900–1550 BC
 Late Helladic (LH): 1550–1050 BC

Crete

Early Minoan (EM): 3200–2160 BC
Middle Minoan (MM): 2160–1600 BC
Late Minoan (LM): 1600–1100 BC

Cyclades

Early Cycladic (EC): 3300–2000 BC
Kastri (EH II–EH III): ca. 2500–2100 BC
Convergence with MM from ca. 2000 BC

Commerce
Commerce was practiced to some extent in very early times, as is proved by the distribution of Melian obsidian over all the Aegean area. Cretan vessels appeared to be exported to Melos, Egypt, and the Greek mainland. In particular, Melian vases, eventually, found their way to Crete. After 1600 BC, there was very close commerce with Egypt, and Aegean goods found their way to all coasts of the Mediterranean. No traces of currency have come to light, excluding certain axeheads, too slight for practical use, had that character. Standard weights have been found, as well as representations of ingots. The Aegean written documents have not yet proved (by being found outside the area) to be epistolary (letter writing) correspondence with other countries. Representations of ships are not common, but several have been observed on Aegean gems, gem-sealings, frying pans, and vases. These vases are of low free-board, with masts and oars. Familiarity with the sea is proved by the free use of marine motifs in decoration. The most detailed illustrations are to be found on the 'ship fresco' at Akrotiri on the island of Thera (Santorini) preserved by the ash fall from the volcanic eruption which destroyed the town there.

Discoveries, later in the 20th century, of sunken trading vessels such as those at Uluburun and Cape Gelidonya off the south coast of Turkey have brought forth an enormous amount of new information about that culture.

Evidence
For details of monumental evidence the articles on Crete, Mycenae, Tiryns, Troad, Cyprus, etc., must be consulted. The most representative site explored up to now is Knossos (see Crete) which has yielded not only the most various but the most continuous evidence from the Neolithic age to the twilight of classical civilization. Next in importance come Hissarlik, Mycenae, Phaestus, Hagia Triada, Tiryns, Phylakope, Palaikastro and Gournia.

Internal evidence
Structures: Ruins of palaces, palatial villas, houses, built dome- or cist-graves and fortifications (Aegean islands, Greek mainland and northwestern Anatolia), but not distinct temples; small shrines, however, and temene (religious enclosures, remains of one of which were probably found at Petsofa near Palaikastro by J. L. Myres in 1904) are represented on intaglios and frescoes. From the sources and from inlay-work we have also representations of palaces and houses.
Structural decoration: Architectural features, such as columns, friezes and various mouldings; mural decoration, such as fresco-paintings, coloured reliefs and mosaic inlay. Roof tiles were also occasionally employed, as at early Helladic Lerna and Akovitika, and later in the Mycenaean towns of Gla and Midea.
Furniture: (a) Domestic furniture, such as vessels of all sorts and in many materials, from huge store jars down to tiny unguent pots; culinary and other implements; thrones, seats, tables, etc., these all in stone or plastered terracotta. (b) Sacred furniture, such as models or actual examples of ritual objects; of these we have also numerous pictorial representations. (c) Funerary furniture, for example, coffins in painted terracotta.
Art products: for example, plastic objects, carved in stone, or ivory, cast or beaten in metals (gold, silver, copper and bronze), or modelled in clay, faience, paste, etc. Very little trace has yet been found of large free-standing sculpture, but many examples exist of sculptors' smaller work. Vases of many kinds, carved in marble or other stones, cast or beaten in metals or fashioned in clay, the latter in enormous number and variety, richly ornamented with coloured schemes, and sometimes bearing moulded decoration. Examples of painting on stone, opaque and transparent. Engraved objects in great number for example, ring-bezels and gems; and an immense quantity of clay impressions, taken from these.
Weapons, tools and implements: In stone, clay, and bronze, and at the last iron, sometimes richly ornamented or inlaid. Numerous representations also of the same. No actual body armour, except such as was ceremonial and buried with the dead, like the gold breastplates in the circle-graves at Mycenae or the full length body armour from Dendra.
Articles of personal use: for example, brooches (fibulae), pins, razors, tweezers, often found as dedications to a deity, for example, in the Dictaean Cavern of Crete. No textiles have survived other than impressions in clay.
Written documents: for example, clay tablets and discs (so far in Crete only), but nothing of more perishable nature, such as skin, papyrus, etc.; engraved gems and gem impressions; legends written with pigment on pottery (rare); characters incised on stone or pottery. These show a number of systems of script employing either ideograms or syllabograms (see Linear B).
Excavated tombs: Of either the pit, chamber or the tholos kind, in which the dead were laid, together with various objects of use and luxury, without cremation, and in either coffins or loculi or simple wrappings.
Public works: Such as paved and stepped roadways, bridges, systems of drainage, etc.

External evidence
Monuments and records of other contemporary civilizations: for example, representations of alien peoples in Egyptian frescoes; imitation of Aegean fabrics and style in non-Aegean lands; allusions to Mediterranean peoples in Egyptian, Semitic or Babylonian records.
Literary traditions of subsequent civilizations: Especially the Hellenic; such as, for example, those embodied in the Homeric poems, the legends concerning Crete, Mycenae, etc.; statements as to the origin of gods, cults and so forth, transmitted to us by Hellenic antiquarians such as Strabo, Pausanias, Diodorus Siculus, etc.
Traces of customs, creeds, rituals, etc.: In the Aegean area at a later time, discordant with the civilization in which they were practiced and indicating survival from earlier systems. There are also possible linguistic and even physical survivals to be considered.
Mycenae and Tiryns are the two principal sites on which evidence of a prehistoric civilization was remarked long ago by the ancient Greeks.

Discovery
The curtain-wall and towers of the Mycenaean citadel, its gate with heraldic lions, and the great "Treasury of Atreus" had borne silent witness for ages before Heinrich Schliemann's time. However, they were regarded as a crude precursor of later Greek culture. It was not until Schliemann's excavations that Mycenaean culture attracted serious scholarly attention.

There had been, however, a good deal of other evidence available before 1876, which, had it been collated and seriously studied, might have discounted the sensation that the discovery of the citadel graves eventually made. For instance, scholars had noted that tributaries appearing in Egyptian art resembled modern Greeks, but were unable to definitely recognize them as such. Nor did the Aegean objects which were lying obscurely in museums in 1870, or thereabouts, provide a sufficient test of the real basis underlying the Hellenic myths of the Argolid, the Troad and Crete, to cause these to be taken seriously. Aegean vases have been exhibited both at Sèvres and Neuchatel since about 1840, the provenance (i.e. source or origin) being in the one case Phylakope in Melos, in the other Cephalonia.

Ludwig Ross, the German archaeologist appointed Curator of the Antiquities of Athens at the time of the establishment of the Kingdom of Greece, by his explorations in the Greek islands from 1835 onwards, called attention to certain early intaglios, since known as Inselsteine; but it was not until 1878 that C. T. Newton demonstrated these to be no strayed Phoenician products. In 1866 primitive structures were discovered on the island of Therasia by quarrymen extracting pozzolana, a siliceous volcanic ash, for the Suez Canal works. When this discovery was followed up in 1870, on the neighbouring Santorini (Thera), by representatives of the French School at Athens, much pottery of a class now known immediately to precede the typical late Aegean ware, and many stone and metal objects, were found. These were dated by the geologist Ferdinand A. Fouqué, somewhat arbitrarily, to 2000 BC, by consideration of the superincumbent eruptive stratum.

Meanwhile, in 1868, tombs at Ialysus in Rhodes had yielded to Alfred Biliotti many painted vases of styles which were called later the third and fourth "Mycenaean"; but these, bought by John Ruskin, and presented to the British Museum, excited less attention than they deserved, being supposed to be of some local fabric of uncertain date. Nor was a connection immediately detected between them and the objects found four years later in a tomb at Menidi in Attica and a rock-cut "bee-hive" grave near the Argive Heraeum.

Even Schliemann's initial excavations at Hissarlik in the Troad did not excite surprise. However, the "Burnt City" now known as Troy II, revealed in 1873, with its fortifications and vases, and a hoard of gold, silver, and bronze objects, which the discoverer connected with it, began to arouse curiosity both among scholars and the general public. With Schliemann's excavations at Mycenae, interest in prehistoric Greece exploded. It was recognized that the character of both the fabric and the decoration of the Mycenaean objects was not that of any previously known style. A wide range in space was proved by the identification of the Inselsteine and the Ialysus vases with the new style, and a wide range in time by collation of the earlier Theraean and Hissarlik discoveries. Many scholars were struck by potential resemblances between objects described by Homer and Mycenaean artifacts.

Schliemann resumed excavations at Hissarlik in 1878, and greatly increased our knowledge of the lower strata, but did not recognize the Aegean remains in his "Lydian" city now known as Late Bronze Age Troy. These were not to be fully revealed until Dr. Wilhelm Dorpfeld, who had become Schliemann's assistant in 1879, resumed the work at Hissarlik in 1892 after Schliemann's death. But by laying bare in 1884 the upper stratum of remains on the rock of Tiryns, Schliemann made a contribution to our knowledge of prehistoric domestic life which was amplified two years later by Christos Tsountas's discovery of the palace at Mycenae. Schliemann's work at Tiryns was not resumed till 1905, when it was proved, as had long been suspected, that an earlier palace underlies the one he had exposed.

From 1886 dates the finding of Mycenaean sepulchres outside the Argolid, from which, and from the continuation of Tsountas's exploration of the buildings and lesser graves at Mycenae, a large treasure, independent of Schliemann's princely gift, has been gathered into the National Museum at Athens. In that year tholos-tombs, most already pillaged but retaining some of their furniture, were excavated at Arkina and Eleusis in Attica, at Dimini near Volos in Thessaly, at Kampos on the west of Mount Taygetus, and at Maskarata in Cephalonia. The richest grave of all was explored at Vaphio in Laconia in 1889, and yielded, besides many gems and miscellaneous goldsmiths' work, two golden goblets chased with scenes of bull-hunting, and certain broken vases painted in a large bold style which remained an enigma until the excavation of Knossos.

In 1890 and 1893, Staes cleared out certain less rich tholos-tombs at Thoricus in Attica; and other graves, either rock-cut "bee-hives" or chambers, were found at Spata and Aphidna in Attica, in Aegina and Salamis, at the Argive Heraeum and Nauplia in the Argolid, near Thebes and Delphi, and not far from the Thessalian Larissa. During the Acropolis excavations in Athens, which terminated in 1888, many potsherds of the Mycenaean style were found; but Olympia had yielded either none, or such as had not been recognized before being thrown away, and the temple site at Delphi produced nothing distinctively Aegean (in dating). The American explorations of the Argive Heraeum, concluded in 1895, also failed to prove that site to have been important in the prehistoric time, though, as was to be expected from its neighbourhood to Mycenae itself, there were traces of occupation in the later Aegean periods.

Prehistoric research had now begun to extend beyond the Greek mainland. Certain central Aegean islands, Antiparos, Ios, Amorgos, Syros and Siphnos, were all found to be singularly rich in evidence of the Middle-Aegean period. The series of Syran-built graves, containing crouching corpses, is the best and most representative that is known in the Aegean. Melos, long marked as a source of early objects but not systematically excavated until taken in hand by the British School at Athens in 1896, yielded at Phylakope remains of all the Aegean periods, except the Neolithic.

A map of Cyprus in the later Bronze Age (such as is given by J. L. Myres and M. O. Richter in Catalogue of the Cyprus Museum) shows more than 25 settlements in and about the Mesaorea district alone, of which one, that at Enkomi, near the site of Salamis, has yielded the richest Aegean treasure in precious metal found outside Mycenae. E. Chantre in 1894 picked up lustreless ware, like that of Hissariik, in central Phtygia and at Pteria, and the English archaeological expeditions, sent subsequently into north-western Anatolia, have never failed to bring back ceramic specimens of Aegean appearance from the valleys of the Rhyndncus, Sangarius and Halys.

In Egypt in 1887, Flinders Petrie found painted sherds of Cretan style at Kahun in the Fayum, and farther up the Nile, at Tell el-Amarna, chanced on bits of no fewer than 800 Aegean vases in 1889. There have now been recognized in the collections at Cairo, Florence, London, Paris and Bologna several Egyptian imitations of the Aegean style which can be set off against the many debts which the centres of Aegean culture owed to Egypt. Two Aegean vases were found at Sidon in 1885, and many fragments of Aegean and especially Cypriot pottery have been found during recent excavations of sites in Philistia by the Palestine Fund.

Sicily, ever since P. Orsi excavated the Sicel cemetery near Lentini in 1877, has proved a mine of early remains, among which appear in regular succession Aegean fabrics and motives of decoration from the period of the second stratum at Hissarlik. Sardinia has Aegean sites, for example, at Abini near Teti; and Spain has yielded objects recognized as Aegean from tombs near Cadiz and from Saragossa.

One land, however, has eclipsed all others in the Aegean by the wealth of its remains of all the prehistoric ages— Crete; and so much so that, for the present, we must regard it as the fountainhead of Aegean civilization, and probably for long its political and social centre. The island first attracted the notice of archaeologists by the remarkable archaic Greek bronzes found in a cave on Mount Ida in 1885, as well as by epigraphic monuments such as the famous law of Gortyna (also called Gortyn). But the first undoubted Aegean remains reported from it were a few objects extracted from Cnossus by Minos Kalokhairinos of Candia in 1878. These were followed by certain discoveries made in the S. plain Messara by F. Halbherr. Unsuccessful attempts at Cnossus were made by both W. J. Stillman and H. Schliemann, and A. J. Evans, coming on the scene in 1893, travelled in succeeding years about the island picking up trifles of unconsidered evidence, which gradually convinced him that greater things would eventually be found. He obtained enough to enable him to forecast the discovery of written characters, till then not suspected in Aegean civilization. The revolution of 1897–1898 opened the door to wider knowledge, and much exploration has ensued, for which see Crete.

Thus the "Aegean Area" has now come to mean the Archipelago with Crete and Cyprus, the Hellenic peninsula with the Ionian islands, and Western Anatolia. Evidence is still wanting for the Macedonian and Thracian coasts. Offshoots are found in the western Mediterranean area, in Sicily, Italy, Sardinia and Spain, and in the eastern Mediterranean area in Syria and Egypt. Regarding the Cyrenaica, we are still insufficiently informed.

End

The final collapse of the Mycenaean civilisation appears to have occurred about 1200 BC. Iron took the place of bronze, cremation took the place of burial of the dead, and writing was lost.

See also
 Mycenaean Greece
 Prehistory of Southeastern Europe

References

  This includes many illustrations, and a more intensive history of the civilizations, as understood in the early 20th century.

External links
Jeremy B. Rutter, "The Prehistoric Archaeology of the Aegean": chronology, history, bibliography
Aegean and Balkan Prehistory: Articles, site-reports and bibliography database concerning the Aegean, Balkans and Western Anatolia